Ske is an Icelandic band whose origins can be traced back to 1992, when a band called Skárren ekkert was founded by Eiríkur Þorleifsson, Frank Hall and Guðmundur Steingrímsson, and joined by Hrannar Ingimarsson in 1998.

History
In 1999, they wrote the music for NPK, a dance performance by the Icelandic Dance Company. The following year Eiríkur, Frank and Guðmundur, along with Guðmundur Hafsteinsson, wrote and performed music for Shakespeare's A Midsummer Night's Dream at the Icelandic National Theatre's (Þjóðleikhúsið) 50th anniversary performance. Hrannar was away in New York with Icelandic rap-band Quarashi, with whom he'd worked extensively as engineer/mixer and guitarist since 1996.

In 2002 the album Life, Death, Happiness and Stuff was ready, with additional performances from Kjartan Guðnason on drums, Una Sveinbjarnardóttir on violin and vocalists Jón Oddur Guðmundsson, Juri Hashimoto, Julie Coadou and Daníel Ágúst Haraldsson.  The album was a cult hit, the songs Julietta 2 and Stuff were picked up by ad-agencies for national television campaigns for The National Bank of Iceland and Icelandair.  The album was also nominated as Album of the Year and 'Julietta 2' was nominated for Song of the Year and won.

In 2003 the band, now consisting of Eiríkur Þorleifsson, Frank Hall, Guðmundur Steingrímsson, Hrannar Ingimarsson, Jón Oddur Guðmundsson, Kjartan Guðnason and Ragnheiður Gröndal, who had started singing with the band at the end of 2002, started work on new songs as well as playing dates in Scandinavia and UK, including Roskilde Festival 2003. In the fall of 2003, Ske composed music for a dance piece written by Lonneke Van Leth, performed by the Icelandic Dance Company.

In 2004, Ske continued work on the new album, as well as playing some dates in UK. Feelings are great, Ske's second album, was released by Smekkleysa in Iceland in October 2004.

In 2005 Ske played Austin, Texas' SXSW and Denmark's SPOT-festival, as well as opening for former Led Zeppelin's Robert Plant in Reykjavík. Ágústa Eva Erlendsdóttir replaced Ragnheiður Gröndal for those dates as well as for a TV appearance on the Icelandic National Television RÚV program Hljómsveit kvöldsins, hosted by Margrét Krístin Blöndal, and Ske's fourth Icelandic Airwaves appearance.

In August 2006 Hössi Ólafsson, formerly the lead vocalist of Quarashi, joined Ske as their lead singer.

In December 2008 Ske finished recording and mixing its third studio album which will be released in January/February 2009. The album was recorded in various studios around Reykjavík and features 12 original songs written collectively by band-members in 2007/2008. English drummer Paul Maguire, formerly a member of The Stairs, plays drums on most of the songs but Orri Páll Dýrason from the band Sigur Rós plays drums on at least 3 songs. Also on percussion is Kjartan Guðnason, former drummer of Ske and currently the drummer of the Icelandic band Menn ársins and a percussionist for the Iceland Symphony Orchestra.

The single "My Lo" was released in Iceland in 2008.

References

External links
Official website

Icelandic musical groups